Mark Allan Elliott Richards (born 9 April 1974) is a former English cricketer.  Richards is a right-handed batsman who bowls right-arm medium pace.  He was born at Bridport, Devon.

Richards made his debut for Devon in the 2002 Minor Counties Championship against Wiltshire.  He played three further Championship matches that season, the last of which came against Berkshire.  In that same season he made his MCCA Knockout Trophy debut for Devon, which came against Dorset.  He played four further Trophy matches that season, the last of which came against the Sussex Cricket Board.

2002 also saw him make his List A debut for Devon, against Yorkshire in the 3rd round of the 2002 Cheltenham & Gloucester Trophy.  He played a further match in that format in 2002, against Cumberland in the 2nd round of the 2003 Cheltenham & Gloucester Trophy which was held in 2002.  Three years later he played a final List A match for Devon against Essex at The Maer Ground in the 1st round of the 2005 Cheltenham & Gloucester Trophy.  In his three List A matches, he took 6 wickets at a bowling average of 19.33, with best figures of 4/22.

Richards played two Second XI Championship matches for the Worcestershire Second XI in 2006.

References

External links
Mark Richards at ESPNcricinfo
Mark Richards at CricketArchive

1974 births
Living people
People from Bridport
Cricketers from Dorset
Cricketers from Devon
English cricketers
Devon cricketers